Daniel Gonzalo Pino (born April 15, 1974) is an American actor who starred as Detective Scotty Valens on the CBS series Cold Case from 2003 to 2010, and as NYPD Detective Nick Amaro in the long-running NBC legal drama Law & Order: Special Victims Unit from 2011 to 2015. In 2002, he appeared in London's West End in Up for Grabs with Madonna. In May 2003, Pino played Desi Arnaz in a CBS special on the life of Lucille Ball, Lucy. He played drug cartel leader Miguel Galindo on Mayans M.C. which airs on FX, and FBI agent John Bishop in procedural crime drama Gone.

Early years and education
Named after his grandfather, Pedro Gonzalo de Armas, Pino was born in Miami, Florida, to Cuban parents. He attended Rockway Middle School and graduated from Miami Coral Park High School in 1992, and from Florida International University in 1996, He also attended New York University's Graduate Acting Program at the Tisch School of the Arts, graduating in 2000.

Career 

Pino is known for his performance as the Mexican drug lord Armadillo Quintero on FX's The Shield. He has also appeared in the films The Lost City (2005) and Flicka (2006), which featured Tim McGraw, and starred in the hit CBS series Cold Case as Detective Scotty Valens. In 2011, Pino joined the cast of Law & Order: Special Victims Unit for its 13th season, along with Chase actress Kelli Giddish, coinciding with Christopher Meloni's departure. On SVU, Pino portrayed NYPD Detective Nick Amaro, a detective transferring from the narcotics squad to the Special Victims Unit.

Pino wrote two episodes of Cold Case: "Stealing Home" and "Metamorphosis". Starting in 2005, he has been in six CBS Cares public service announcements, with other stars of CBS original programs. He has made single appearances on The Sharon Osbourne Show in 2004, The Late Late Show with Craig Ferguson in 2005, The Drop in 2005, Entertainment Tonight in 2008, and The Ellen DeGeneres Show in 2011. In 2016, he played Alex Vargas in Scandal and Democratic Senator Luke Healy in BrainDead.

In 2017, he joined the cast of the procedural crime drama series Gone, as FBI agent John Bishop, alongside Chris Noth and Leven Rambin. He currently co-stars in FX's Sons of Anarchy spinoff series Mayans M.C., as cartel leader Miguel Galindo.

In August 2020, he joined the cast of Stephen Chbosky's film adaptation of the broadway musical Dear Evan Hansen as Larry Murphy, a role that was re-conceived for the film from "father" to "stepfather," with the character renamed as Larry Mora.

Personal life 
Pino is fluent in Spanish as evidenced by TV shows such as Cold Case and Mayans MC, and interviews he has done.

Pino and his wife, Lilly, married February 15, 2002. They have two sons, Luca Daniel, born February 15, 2006, and Julian Franco, born June 5, 2007.

Filmography

Film

Television

Awards and nominations
Pino has won two awards so far and has been nominated for five, all from his work on Cold Case and Law & Order: Special Victims Unit.

References

External links
 Danny Pino CBS bio
 
 Danny Pino on Twitter

1974 births
Living people
American male film actors
American male television actors
American male voice actors
Hispanic and Latino American male actors
American entertainers of Cuban descent
Male actors from Miami
21st-century American male actors
Florida International University alumni
Tisch School of the Arts alumni